Aeroflot Flight 1036 ( Reys 1036 Aeroflota) was a domestic scheduled passenger flight operated by Aeroflot that crashed during takeoff from Sochi International Airport on 1 October 1972. All 109 people aboard the Ilyushin Il-18V perished in the crash. It is the second worst accident involving an Ilyushin Il-18 and it was the worst accident involving one at the time.

Aircraft
The aircraft involved in the accident was an Ilyushin Il-18V with four Ivchenko AI-20K engines, registered CCCP-75507 to Aeroflot.  The aircraft rolled off the assembly line on 3 August 1963. At the time of the accident, the aircraft had a total of 15,700 flight hours and 7,900 pressurization cycles.

Crew
There were eight crew members aboard the fatal flight. The cockpit crew consisted of:
Captain V. G. Tikhonov, (В. Г. Тихонов)
Copilot V. A. Slobodskaya (В. А. Слободская)
Navigator A. S. Zmeevsky (А. С. Змеевский)
Flight engineer V. V. Meshchaninov (В. В. Мещанинов)
Radio operator B. V. Spelov (Б. В. Спелов)

Synopsis
Flight 1036 crashed during the initial climb phase of takeoff from the Sochi-Moscow route.  On the flight were 100 adult passengers, one child, and eight crew members. Psychologist Vladimir Nebylitsyn and his wife were among the passengers of Flight 1036.  The weather of the day of the accident was clear, with visibility over 5 kilometers, mild winds, and an air temperature of 17 °C.

At 19:21 local time the IL-18 departed from Sochi Airport at a bearing of 240°.  At 19:22 the flight crew contacted air traffic control for further instructions.  The air traffic controller instructed the flight to make a right turn with a climb of up to 3000 meters to Lazarevskoye; the crew of the Ilyushin Il-18 confirmed hearing the instructions. At an altitude of 150–250 meters, the pilots began to perform the right turn when the aircraft unexpectedly veered into a steep left turn with a sharp nosedive, and then crashed into the Black Sea.

At 19:40 air traffic control received a message from warships in the area that a plane crashed, describing the route; witnesses reported the aircraft turned onto a bearing of 220° about 10.5 km from the shore before it veered off and crashed.  At 23:52 about 5-6 kilometers from the shore debris from the aircraft and fragments of bodies were found floating on the surface of the sea.  All 109 people aboard the airliner died.

Causes
Investigators proposed several hypotheses for the cause of the accident.  No traces of explosives were found on any wreckage or human remains.  Mechanical failure was also suggested but not able to be proven beyond a reasonable doubt.  The most investigated hypothesis was the possibility of birdstrikes damaging the aircraft, specifically by migrating birds.  Due to the aircraft crashing into the Black Sea to a depth of 600 meters and into the mud, limiting the investigation, it was impossible to determine for certain the cause or causes of the crash.

External links
 ASN

References 

Aviation accidents and incidents in 1972
Aviation accidents and incidents in the Soviet Union
1036
1972 in the Soviet Union
Accidents and incidents involving the Ilyushin Il-18